Stela Popa (born 7 August 1982 in Coşcodeni) is a journalist and author from Moldova. She works for Romanian National Television, Jurnal TV and Vocea Basarabiei.

Biography

Stela Popa was born on 7 August 1982 in Coşcodeni, Sângerei District. She studied at Prometeu-Prim Lyceum and graduated from Moldova State University. She worked for Radio-Sângera, Euro TV Moldova, TV7 (Moldova) and was a correspondent of Antena 1 (Romania) in Chişinău. Stela Popa has been the director of Vocea Basarabiei in Bucharest since June 2009. She married Romanian sociologist Dan Dungaciu in October 2012.

Awards

 Diplomă de excelenţă şi merite la învăţătură, Moldova State University
 Prize VIP of the Faculty of Journalism and Communication Studies of the Moldova State University
 Soros Foundation Prize, Contest "Jurnalismul de azi, jurnalismul de mâine"
 Top VIP Magazin "Cele mai sexy 50 de femei ale Moldovei"
 Prize FIJET România

Works

"100 de zile", Editura Tritonic, Bucharest, 2010, 464 pages. The book is dedicated to 7 April 2009 Moldova civil unrest

References

External links 

 Interview with Stela Popa (Romanian)
 Stela Popa. Director "Radio Vocea Basarabiei Bucureşti"
 Adevărul, Stela Popa:"Basarabenii vor forţa uşa Uniunii Europene"
 Stela Popa: Europe is speaking in vain to Moldova
 Stela Popa . Faţa "EU TV"
 Stela Popa: Europe is speaking in vain to Moldova
 Vocea Basarabiei, Stela Popa în lista celor mai frumoase 50 de femei din RM
 stelapopa.unimedia.md 
 "100 De Zile"- Stela Popa- Despre revolta din 7 aprilie de la Chişinău!- 

1982 births
Living people
People from Sîngerei District
Moldova State University alumni
Romanian people of Moldovan descent
Moldovan journalists
Moldovan writers
Moldovan activists
Moldovan women journalists
Euronova Media Group
Jurnal Trust Media